The 36th Ryder Cup Matches were held 22–24 September 2006 in Ireland at the Palmer Course of the K Club in Straffan, County Kildare, west of Dublin. It was the first time the event was played in Ireland.

Europe won by 18 to 9 points, equalling their record winning margin of two years earlier for their third consecutive win, a first for Europe. Swedish rookie Henrik Stenson made the winning putt, just moments after Luke Donald sank a putt to ensure Europe retained the trophy.

Course
The K Club has two Arnold Palmer-designed championship courses and the 36th Ryder Cup was held on the Palmer Course (also known as the North or Old Course). The course is a parkland course located on the banks of the River Liffey, threaded through mature woodlands on the Straffan country estate.

Television
Domestically, Sky Sports provided live coverage of all sessions.

In the United States, coverage of the first day was recorded live, but presented on tape-delay by USA Network.  Bill Macatee hosted from the 18th tower. On Saturday, NBC Sports presented coverage on tape, but recorded live. NBC then aired the singles live on Sunday morning. Dan Hicks and Johnny Miller hosted from the 18th tower, Gary Koch and Bob Murphy called holes, while on-course reporters were Mark Rolfing, Roger Maltbie, and Dottie Pepper. To provide a European perspective, NBC used former European team player Nick Faldo as a guest analyst on the Saturday afternoon session.  Faldo had worked in the same role for NBC at the 2002 Ryder Cup, and at the time of the 2006 edition was in between jobs, having worked as an analyst for ABC Sports from 2004 to 2006, but having signed with CBS Sports for 2007 and beyond.

Format
The Ryder Cup is a match play event, with each match worth one point.  The competition format used in 2004 and 2006 was as follows:
Day 1 (Friday) – 4 fourball (better ball) matches in a morning session and 4 foursome (alternate shot) matches in an afternoon session
Day 2 (Saturday) – 4 fourball matches in a morning session and 4 foursome matches in an afternoon session
Day 3 (Sunday) – 12 singles matches
With a total of 28 points, 14 points were required to win the Cup, and 14 points were required for the defending champion to retain the Cup.  All matches were played to a maximum of 18 holes.

Team qualification and selection

Europe
The European team consisted of:
 The top five players on the Ryder Cup World Points List
Total points earned in Official World Golf Ranking events from  2005 to  2006 and then only in the BMW International Open, which ended on 3 September
 The five players, not qualified above, on the Ryder Cup European Points List
Money earned in official European Tour events from  2005 to  2006
 Two captain's picks

United States
The United States team consisted of:
 The top ten players on the Ryder Cup Points List
Total points earned in PGA Tour events from 22 August 2004 to 20 August 2006. Points were awarded for top-10 finishes in these events based on the following table:

 Two captain's picks

Teams

Captains picks are shown in yellow; the world rankings and records are at the start of the 2006 Ryder Cup.

As vice-captains, European captain Ian Woosnam selected Peter Baker and Des Smyth, to assist him during the tournament.

Captains picks are shown in yellow; the world rankings and records are at the start of the 2006 Ryder Cup.

As vice-captains, United States captain Tom Lehman selected Corey Pavin and Loren Roberts, to assist him during the tournament.

Friday's matches

Morning four-ball

Afternoon foursomes

Saturday's matches

Morning four-ball

Afternoon foursomes

Sunday's singles matches

Individual player records
Each entry refers to the win–loss–half record of the player.

Source:

Europe

United States

References

External links
Official Ryder Cup site for Team USA
Official Ryder Cup site for Team Europe
PGA of America: 2006 Ryder Cup
GolfCompendium.com: 2006 Ryder Cup
Official K Club website

Ryder Cup
Golf tournaments in the Republic of Ireland
Golf in County Kildare
International sports competitions hosted by Ireland
Ryder Cup
Ryder Cup
Ryder Cup